Yellow Crane Tower is a traditional Chinese tower located in Wuhan. The current structure was built in 1981, but the tower has existed in various forms from as early as AD 223. It is situated on Snake Hill, one kilometer away from the original site, on the banks of the Yangtze River in Wuchang District.

History

The Yuanhe Maps and Records of Prefectures and Counties, written almost 600 years after the construction of the tower, notes that after Sun Quan, founder of the kingdom of Eastern Wu, built the fort of Xiakou in 223, a tower was constructed at/on the Yellow Crane Jetty, west of Xiakou, and hence its name.

The tower has been destroyed twelve times, both by warfare and by fire, in the Ming and Qing dynasties and was repaired on ten separate occasions. The last tower at the original site was built in 1868 and destroyed in 1884. In 1907, a new tower was built near the site of the Yellow Crane Tower. Zhang Zhidong proposed '' (Aoliaolou Tower) as the name for this tower and wrote an antithetical couplet for it. In 1957, the  Wuhan Yangtze River Bridge was built with one trestle of the bridge on the Yellow Crane Tower's site.

Relic Protection 
The Sacred Stupa (simplified Chinese: 胜像宝塔，pinyin: shèng xiàng bǎo tǎ )  is 9.36 meters high and 5.68 meters wide. It is built with external stone and internal bricks, mainly stone masonry, and a small amount of bricks are used in the internal tower room. It is the oldest and most complete single building preserved in the former site of the Yellow Crane Tower. The Sacred Stupa is a Stupa of Tibetan Buddhism Tantric Buddhism, and it is also the first type of stupa after Buddhism inherited from India to China. It is the only existing Lama-style white stupa in Wuhan, and it provides important physical materials for studying the history and religion of the famous historical and cultural city Wuhan in the late Yuan and early Ming Dynasties.

Legends 

Notwithstanding the tower's current location on Snake Hill being unrelated to its original location one kilometre away, the two popular legends related to it invoke the hill. In the first, an Immortal named Wang Zi'an rode away from Snake Mountain on a yellow crane and a tower was later built in commemoration of this story. In the second legend, Fei Yi becomes immortal and rides a yellow crane, often stopping on Snake Hill to take a rest.

The tower is also a sacred site of Taoism. Lü Dongbin is said to ascend to heaven from here. There is a small cave in the hill beneath the tower with Lü Dongbin statue. The cave has been called Lü Zu Dong, literately meaning cave of Lü Dongbin.

Literature

Poem by Cui Hao 
Yellow Crane Tower was made famous by an 8th-century poem written by Cui Hao, titled "Yellow Crane Tower". The original text of the poem is shown below:

A modern English translation is:

Long ago one's gone riding the yellow crane, all that remained is the Yellow Crane Tower.
Once the yellow crane left it will never return, for one thousand years the clouds wandered carelessly.
The clear river reflects each Hanyang tree, fragrant grasses lushly grow on Parrot Island.
At sunset, which direction leads to my hometown? One could not help feeling melancholy along the misty river.

Poem by Li Bai 
There are other famous poems about the Yellow Crane Tower by Li Bai. One was written on the occasion of Li Bai parting with his friend and poetic colleague, Meng Haoran. The poem is titled "Seeing off Meng Haoran for Guangling at Yellow Crane Tower", and is shown in its original form below:

A modern English translation is:

My old friend bids farewell to me in the west at Yellow Crane Tower.
Amid March's mist and flowers he goes down to Yangzhou.
The distant image of his lonely sail disappears in the blue sky,
And all I see is the Long River flowing to the edge of sky.

Tourism
The tower and its surroundings have been marked as Yellow Crane Tower park. There are tour services that can be hired for a fee at the entrance. The top of the tower has a broad view of its surroundings and the Yangtze River. Yellow Crane Tower is considered one of the Four Great Towers of China. In its modern version, it has the appearance of an ancient tower but is built of modern materials, including an elevator. Each level has its own display. To the east on the hill, a large temple bell may be rung by tourists for a small fee. There are court dances in the western yard during the week-long National Day of the People's Republic of China celebration. The tower is classified as an AAAAA scenic area by the China National Tourism Administration. At south side of the tower, there is a statue of Yue Fei because he was garrison around this area in Song Dynasty.

Gallery

See also

Crane (bird)
Crane in Chinese mythology
Four Great Towers of China
Pavilion of Prince Teng
Poetry of Mao Zedong
Yueyang Tower
Wuhan
Yangtze River
Xian (Taoism)

References

Wan, Jingjun 1982. Cui Hao Poem Annotations. Shanghai Ancient Books Press. 54 pages.

External links

Official website of Yellow Crane Tower

AAAAA-rated tourist attractions
Buildings and structures in Wuhan
Chinese poems
Rebuilt buildings and structures in China
Towers in China
Tourist attractions in Wuhan
Traditional Chinese architecture